Koumara Swapnangal is a 1991 Indian Malayalam film, directed by K. S. Gopalakrishnan. The film stars Pattom Sadan, Prameela, Santhosh and Chandrasekharan in the lead roles.

Plot

Cast 

Pattom Sadan
Prameela
Santhosh
Chandrasekharan
Mukundan
Kalaranjini
Prathapachandran
Bahadoor
Jayarekha
Karikkakam Mani
Kuyili
Lalithasree
M. G. Soman
Naveena
Priya (New)
Ragini (New)
Ramu
Ravi Menon
Sajith
Valsala Menon
Vincent
Master Ajith

References

External links 
 

1990s Malayalam-language films
1991 films
Films directed by K. S. Gopalakrishnan